Gerald George Drummond Johnson (born September 8, 1976) is a Costa Rican former football player.

Club career
Drummond made his professional debut with Saprissa on 8 November 1995 against Ramonense and he won four national championships with them and two CONCACAF Champions Cups, and was part of the team that played the 2005 FIFA Club World Championship Toyota Cup, where Saprissa finished third behind São Paulo and Liverpool.

He joined Ramonense in summer 2008 and retired in February 2009.

International career
Drummond played with his brother in the U-20 Football World Youth Championship held in Qatar in 1995, as well as in Brazilian team Flamengo's minor league system.

He made his debut for Costa Rica in an October 1996 friendly match against Venezuela and earned a total of 16 caps, scoring 6 goals. He represented his country at the 1997 and 1999 UNCAF Nations Cups.

His final international was an August 2003 friendly match against Austria.

International goals
Scores and results list Costa Rica's goal tally first.

Personal life
He is married to Karol Hernández. His twin brother, Jervis Drummond, also played for Saprissa and the national team. His son, also called Gerald, is an athlete.

References

External links
 
 

1976 births
Living people
People from Limón Province
Association football forwards
Costa Rican twins
Costa Rican men's footballers
Costa Rica international footballers
Deportivo Saprissa players
C.S. Herediano footballers
A.D. Ramonense players
Twin sportspeople
Copa Centroamericana-winning players